Anne Azéma  (born October 19, 1957) is a French-born soprano, scholar, and stage director. She is currently artistic director of the Boston Camerata. She has been an important or leading singer of early music since 1993. She has created and directed programs for the Boston Camerata and is also noted as a music scholar. She is perhaps best known for performing music from the Middle Ages, lute songs from the Renaissance period, Baroque sacred music, Shaker song, and contemporary music theater. She is also a music educator and a researcher. She has performed in Japan, Germany, the US, Australia and elsewhere.

Career
Anne Azéma was born in Niort, France, on October 19, 1957. She spent her childhood in Strasbourg and came to the United States to study at the New England Conservatory in 1979. She first sang with Boston Camerata in the 1981–1982 season.

Her special field is secular/vernacular song of France and Provence in the Middle Ages. She shared a "Grand Prix du Disque" for her role as Iseult in the Boston Camerata's recording of Tristan and Iseult.  Four solo recital albums,  The Unicorn,  The Game of Love,  Provence Mystique and Etoile du Nord also document her original work in this area.

Azéma is a founding member of the Camerata Mediterranea, touring with them internationally and appearing on all of their CDs (Edison Prize). She has also been prominent in many of the Boston Camerata's American music projects, taking the role of Mother Ann Lee of the Shakers in the dance-and-music theater work "Borrowed Light" (premiered in 2004) by Finnish choreographer Tero Saarinen and Azéma's husband, Camerata director emeritus Joel Cohen. Azéma's current discography numbers over thirty five recordings as a soloist, recitalist, and/or director on the Warner — Erato, Harmonia Mundi, Virgin, Nonesuch, Bridge, Calliope, Atma and K 617 labels.

Anne Azéma is the founder and director of the European-based Ensemble Aziman.

In 2007 Ms. Azéma directed the music for a staged work Le Tournoi de Chauvency, performed in major theaters of eastern France and Luxembourg.

In 2011, Azéma was decorated as a Chevalier des Arts et des Lettres of the French Republic and promoted Officier des Arts et des Lettres in 2021.

Discography

Soloist
CDs Recordings: Recital and Music Direction
 Le Tournoi de Chauvency : Une joute d’Amour en Lorraine, K617- 2007
 Etoile du nord : Gauthier de Coincy et le miracle médiéval, Calliope - 2003 (CD of the Year, Toronto Star, 10 de Répertoire)
 Die Stadt der Narre:  weltliche und geistliche Macht im Frankreich und der Provence des Mittlealters, WDR - 2001
 El Maestro,  WDR - 2000
 Provence mystique : Sacred Songs of the Middle Ages,  Erato  - 1998  (10 de Répertoire, **** Le Monde de la musique, YYYYY Diapason, nominated for the Grand Prix des Discophiles, ffff Télérama, 5 Classica)
 Le Jeu d’amour : the game of love in Medieval France,  Erato – 1996, (10 de Répertoire, **** Le Monde de la Musique)
 The Unicorn : Medieval French love songs,  Erato   - 1994 (10 de Répertoire, Choc du Monde de la Musique, 'Critics Choice’ Gramophone, YYYYY Diapason)

As vocal soloist and Director
 Hodie Christus Natus Est, The Boston Camerata, Harmonia Mundi - 2021
 Dido and Aeneas: An Opera for Distanced Lovers, The Boston Camerata - 2020
 Free America! The Boston Camerata, Harmonia Mundi - 2018
 Treasures of Devotion, The Boston Camerata, Music and Arts - 2018
 A Mediterranean Christmas, The Boston Camerata, Warner - 2006
 L'harmonie du Monde, Doulce Mémoire, Virgin/Naïve  - 2003
 Li tans Nouviaus, Constantinople Ensemble, ATMA - 2003 (nominated Opus, Montréal)
 The Almanac : Shira Kammen and Friends, Bright Angel Records - 2003
 Golden Harvest: More Shaker songs, The Boston Camerata, Glissando - 2000
 Cantigas,  Camerata Mediterranea, Erato  (Edison Prize, 10 de Répertoire) - 1999
 Liberty Tree, The Boston Camerata, Erato - 1998
 What then is Love: Elizabethan Songbook, The Boston Camerata, Erato - 1998
 Douce Beauté, Pierre Guédron, The Boston Camerata, Erato - 1998
 Angels, The Boston Camerata & Tod Machover, Erato - 1997
 Johnny Johnson, Kurt Weill;  The Boston Camerata, Erato (Disque de l'année, Le Monde; Diapason D'Or; Choc du Monde de la Musique) – 1997
 Brain Opera: Tod Machover - 1996
 Trav'ling Home: American Spirituals,  The Boston Camerata, Erato - 1996
 Carmina Burana, The Boston Camerata,  Erato ( 10 de Répertoire) - 1996
 Farewell Unkind, Songs and Dances of John Dowland, The Boston Camerata. Erato  (Choc du Monde de la Musique)  -  1996
 Quel Diletto, Organisatie Oude Muziek, Utrecht – 1995
 Le Roman de Fauvel, The Boston Camerata, Erato, 10 de Répertoire) – 1995
 Simple Gifts: Shaker Chants and Spirituals, The Boston Camerata, Erato – 1995
 Bernatz Ventadorn: Le Fou sur le Pont, Camerata Mediterranea, Erato (nominated, Grand Prix des Discophiles, Critic's Choice, Grammophone) - 1994
 An American Christmas, The Boston Camerata,  Erato - 1993
 Nueva España, The Boston Camerata, Erato - 1992
 Jean Gilles, Lamentations;  The Boston Camerata, Erato - 1992
 The American Vocalist, The Boston Camerata, Erato - 1991
 Lo Gai Saber, Camerata Mediterranea, Erato - 1991
 A Baroque Christmas, The Boston Camerata,  Nonesuch - 1991
 Valis, Tod Machover, Bridge -  (CD of the Year, The New York Times) - 1990
 Le Pont Sacré, Erato (Référence de Compact) - 1990
 A Renaissance Christmas, The Boston Camerata, Nonesuch  - 1989
 Jean Gilles, Requiem;  The Boston Camerata, Erato - 1989
 Tristan & Iseult,  The Boston Camerata, Erato (Choc du Monde de la Musique, 10 de Répertoire, 	 Grand Prix du Disque) - 1987
 Noël, Noël: A French Christmas,  Erato - 1988
 New Britain, The Boston Camerata, Erato - 1986
 La Primavera, The Boston Camerata, Erato – 1983
 Josquin des Prés; Missa Pange Lingua et motets, Harmonia Mundi - 1982

References 

 https://operawire.com/the-boston-cameratas-anne-azema-given-major-honor-by-french-government/

Sources

 https://m.facebook.com/thebostoncamerata/photos/a-treasureone-of-the-best-early-music-ensembles-in-the-worldtreasures-of-devotio/10157673411584048/

 https://longy.edu/team/anne-azema/
 https://bostoncamerata.org/2021site/wp-content/uploads/2021/12/Anne-Azema-Honored-December-2021.pdf
 Hodie Christus Natus Est https://bostoncamerata.org/2021site/wp-content/uploads/2021/12/905339DerSpiegel.pdf
 Hodie Christus Natus Est https://www.resmusica.com/2021/12/22/la-boston-camerata-vous-souhaite-nova-gaudia-pour-noel-harmonia-mundi/
 Hodie Christus Natus Est https://www.millenniumofmusic.com/medieval-christmas-special/
 France Musique, Anne Azéma: https://www.francemusique.fr/emissions/musique-matin/la-matinale-avec-anne-azema-98772

External links
 

French emigrants to the United States
American operatic sopranos
People from Niort
American performers of early music
Women performers of early music
Living people
1957 births
New England Conservatory alumni
20th-century American women opera singers
21st-century American women opera singers
Chevaliers of the Ordre des Arts et des Lettres